A Naifa is a Portuguese music group.

Albums
 Canções Subterrâneas (2004)
 3 Minutos Antes da Maré Encher (2006)
 Uma Inocente Inclinação para o Mal (2008)
 não se deitam comigo corações obedientes (February 2012)

References

External links
 

Portuguese musical groups
Musical groups established in 2004
2004 establishments in Portugal